Hiv Rural District is in the Central District of Savojbolagh County, Alborz province, Iran. At the census of 2006, its population was 14,352 in 3,992 households, and in the most recent census of 2016, it had increased to 15,164 in 4,927 households. The largest of its eight villages is Hiv, with 8,697 people.

References 

Savojbolagh County

Rural Districts of Alborz Province

Populated places in Alborz Province

Populated places in Savojbolagh County